Merryn Doidge (born 2 December 2000, Cornwall) is an English rugby union player. She plays for Exeter Chiefs at club level and was an invitational player for the England squad at the 2021 Women's Six Nations.

International career 
Doidge played for England U20s and the National Academy side against the US and Canada. She was selected as an Invitational player for the 2021 Women's Six Nations Championships. She was called up to the bench for England's game versus France in April 2021.

Club career 
She played for Bristol Bears in 2019 before joining the Exeter Chiefs in 2020.

Early life and education 
Born in Cornwall, Doidge started playing rugby at Liskeard-Looe alongside her brother. She moved to Newquay Queen Bees U15s at the age of 12.

She attended Exeter College where she captained the school's side in her second year. She was selected for Cornwall and England U18s the same year.

She is currently studying Sports Science at the University of Exeter.

References 

2000 births
Living people
England women's international rugby union players
English female rugby union players
Cornish rugby union players
Exeter Chiefs players
Rugby union players from Cornwall